As the Roman kingdom successfully overcame opposition from the Italic hill tribes, and became a larger state, the age of tyranny in the eastern Mediterranean began to subside. Inspired by the idea of new constitutions arising there, the Roman populace threw off the yoke of tyranny and established a republic. The army was now facing threats from all of Europe and could only respond through change. This article covers the military establishment of the Roman Republic. For previous changes in the Roman army, see military establishment of the Roman kingdom.

The historian Polybius gives us a clear picture of the republican army at what is arguably its height in 160 BC. Serving in the army was part of Roman civic duty. To serve in the armies of Rome, one had to purchase one's own equipment, and soldiers were sorted into different classes according to wealth. Velites made up the lower class soldiers; it was this class which made up the majority of the heavy infantry legions characteristic to Rome. The Equites, or Equestrians, were the higher class citizens so named because they could afford to maintain at least one horse; this class made up the Roman Citizen Cavalry, which, through its evolution, transformed into one of the prizes of the late Republic, only to disappear by the time of the Empire.

Pre-Marian military
In the late republic, the army became an instrument for successful international warfare, due to the reforms of one of Rome's greatest generals, Gaius Marius, a man admired and imitated by Julius Caesar. His changes were so critical to the success of Roman legions that the army is characterized in history as "pre-Marian" and "post-Marian" or just "Marian".

The draft
The highest officers of the military were the two consuls for that year, who were also the leaders of the Roman Senate. Each of them ordinarily commanded an army group of two legions: they also had  responsibility for raising these troops. In militaristic Rome, the highest civilian officers were also the military chiefs of staff and the commanding generals in battle. They answered only to the Senate.

Raising the legions was an annual affair. The term of service was one year, although many candidates no doubt were picked year after year. The magistrates decided who in the tribes were eligible for selection.

The word we translate as "magistrate" was the title of a tribal official, a tribunus ("of the tribes"). Here a basic division of the military and civilian branches applied, as well as the subjection of the military to the civilian. The working organizations of the tribe were called comitia (committees). They elected tribunes of the plebs ("tribunes of the people") as well as military tribunes  ("tribune of the soldiers"), who were careerists with at least five or six years' service experience. A career would include both military and civilian offices. The six military tribunes were to be the senior staff of the legion.

On election day, the presiding tribune sent the men of the tribe to appear before the military tribunes in groups of four. The four senior staffs of the future legions observed a priority of selection, which rotated. Each staff would take its pick, man by man until each had selected 4200 men, the complements of four legions. The selection of 16,800 men must have taken several days.

If the circumstances of the state required it, the complement could be expanded to include more men, or the consuls could draft as many as four legions each. Additional forces could be drafted under ad hoc commanders called proconsules, who served "in place of consuls." In the later republic, the relatively small number of legions commanded by the consuls (2–4) resulted in their power being overshadowed by the proconsuls, the provincial governors. Provincial governors often would command more loyalty from their troops than their consular counterparts did, and governors were able to raise vast numbers of troops.

While provincial armies technically were supposed to stay within the provinces over which their governors had jurisdiction, by the middle of the 1st century BC this rule was ignored. By the end of the Republic, the various commanders participating in Rome's civil wars had raised the number of legions throughout the provinces to more than fifty, many under the command of a single man.

The necessity of raising legions quickly, to offset battle losses, resulted in an abbreviation of the recruitment process. The government appointed two boards, of three military tribunes each, empowered to enter any region in the Roman jurisdiction for the purpose of enlisting men. These tribunes were not elected. The experience requirement was dropped in the case of aristocratic appointees. Some were as young as 18, although this age was considered acceptable for a young aristocrat on his way up the cursus honorum, or ladder of offices.

The appointed tribunes conducted an ad hoc draft, or dialects, to recruit men. They tended to select the youngest and most capable-looking. It was similar to later naval press gangs, except that Roman citizens were entitled to some process, no matter how abbreviated. If they had to, the appointed tribunes drafted slaves, as they did after the Battle of Cannae.

Soldiers who had served out their time and had obtained their discharge (mission), but had voluntarily re-enlisted, were called evocati.

The Standard Legion
A standard Republican legion before the reforms of Gaius Marius (“the early Republic”) contained about 4500 men divided into the velites, the principes, and the hastati, of  1200 men each, also the triarii, of 600 men, and the equities, of 300 men. The first three types stood forward in battle; the triarii stood back. The velites and the equites were used mainly for various kinds of support.

The class system of Servius Tullius already had organized society to support the military. He practically had created a "store" in which officers could "shop" for the resources they needed. Officers were elected by the civilian centuries, usually from the classic, or from the patricii if the latter were not included in the classic (there is some question about how this worked).

There were available 80 centuries of wealthy classic, 40 of young men ages 17 to 45, and 40 of men 45 and older. These citizens could afford whatever arms and armor the officers thought they needed. The classic could go into any branch of the legion, but generally, veterans were preferred for the triarii, and young men for the velites. The rest was filled out from the young 40 centuries. The older 40 were kept for emergencies, which occurred frequently. These older men were roughly equivalent to the United States Army Reserve.

If the arms requirement was less severe, or the expensive troops were in short supply, the recruiters selected from Classes 2 through 4, which again offered either older or younger men. Class 5 were centuries of specialists, such as carpenters. The Romans preferred not to use Class 6, but if the need was very great they were known to recruit even from slaves and the poor, who would have to be equipped with the state.

The full equipage of arms and armor were the helmet with colored crest and face protectors, breastplates or chain mail (if a soldier could afford it), greaves, the parma (a round shield), the scutum (an oblong wrap-around of hiding on a wood frame, edged with metal, with the insignia of the legion painted on it), the pilum (the hasta veligers, a light javelin of about 3 feet with a 9-inch metal head), and a short sword they borrowed from Spanish tribes, the gladius. The gladius was both pointed for thrusting and edged for slashing.

These arms could be combined in various ways, except that one battle-line had to be armed in the same way. Most typical was a line of principes armed with pole and gladii and defended by the scuti. The hastati could be armed the same way, or with the hasta and parma. The velites bore the hasta veligers and depended on running to get them away after a throw, which is why only the young were chosen for that job.

The basic unit of the army was the company-sized century of 60 men commanded by a centurion. He had under him two junior officers, the options, each of whom had a standard-bearer, or vexillarius. Presumably, he used the two officers to form two squads. In addition, a squad of 20 elites was attached to the century, probably instructed ad hoc by the centurion.

Two centuries made up a manipulandum of 120 men. Each line of battle contained ten maniples, 1200 men, except that the triarii numbered only 600. The legion of 4200 infantry created in this way was supported by 300 equities, or cavalry, organized in ten turmae (squadrons) of 30 horse each, under a magister equitum ("Master of the Horse"), who took orders from the legion commander. Cavalry was used for scouting, skirmishing and various sorts of clean-up — they also constituted another reserve that could be thrown into the battle. The Republic was ignorant of armies on horseback, which, coming off the steppes of Central Asia in blitzkrieg operations, were to trouble the later empire.

The Legion in battle
Servius Tullius, who most like originally was an Etruscan soldier of fortune, identified the disadvantages of an army recruited from landowners: such an army depended heavily on a large farmer-class of citizens to provide troops. So Tullius pressed for reforms that granted veterans land. Although he was assassinated he did establish the precedent of granting land to veterans.

The army at first was not overly successful, partly because it faced superior generals, and partly because of its inexperience. Roman commanders gave up trying to defeat Hannibal, the Carthaginian general, by direct combat as he ravaged Italy. The most successful Roman general at that time, Quintus Fabius Maximus Verrucosus, surnamed Cunctator ("the delayer"), camped at a distance and watched the doings of the Carthaginians, while his troops harassed the Carthaginian army on its fringes.

Later, though, the army came into the hands of a family of careerists and professional soldiers, the Cornelii, a gens of the most ancient stock, patrician in the best sense of the word. They were the first real successors to Servius. After much trial and error, suffering personal losses, they produced one of the best and most influential generals Rome ever had, Publius Cornelius Scipio Africanus. He built the Servian army into a victorious fighting machine.

"Let the Carthaginians ravage Italy," Scipio declared; he took the war to Carthage, landing in North Africa with a republican army. The strategy succeeded: Hannibal was recalled at once; he came home immediately, with a disrupted army, and he was beaten by Scipio at the Battle of Zama, in 202 BC. Using the tactics developed by Scipio, now entitled Africanus, plus good generalship, the army, at last, lived up to the potential imparted to it by King Servius.

Roman army tactics worked as follows: the general first picked his ground. The Roman military now understood fairly well the importance of taking the initiative and picking its own ground, with some infamous exceptions. If the terrain was not right, the army remained within its fortified camp (which was virtually unassailable) until the enemy moved on, and then followed, waiting for an opportunity to engage. The ideal terrain was a gently sloping hill with a stream at the bottom. The enemy would have to ford the stream and move up the slope. The legion was drawn up in three lines of battle, with the thermae and the velites placed as the situation required. The hastati in front and the principes behind were stationed in a line of maniples like chess pieces, ten per line, separated from each other. The two centuries of a maniple fought side by side. The line of principes was offset so as to cover the gaps in the hastati, and the triarii, somewhat more thinly-spread, covered the principes.

Roman soldiers fought in long thin lines. Such open formations allowed the Romans, often outnumbered, to outflank an enemy using a deep formation. The last thing they wanted was to be crushed together and cut down without being able to use their weapons, as they had been so many times before, and as so many armies who never studied Roman warfare were to be later. For the Romans, every man by regulation was allowed one square yard in which to fight, and square yards were separated by gaps of three feet.

The thermae and the bands of velites (skirmishers) made forays opportunistically, trying to disrupt the ranks of the enemy or prevent them from crossing the stream if there was one. While they were doing this, the rest of the legion advanced. At a signal, the skirmishers retired through or around Roman ranks; there probably were trumpet calls, but we know little about them. Picking up speed, the first and second ranks launched spears, the second rank over the heads of the first using light lance with launchers, the first rank at the last moment with pale, or javelins. On impact, the heavy iron points drove through shields and armor both, pinning men together and disrupting the line. The hastati then drew gladii and closed. So great was the impact, we hear from Caesar, that sometimes the men would jump up on the enemy shields to cut downward.

What happened next depended on the success of the hastati. If they were victorious, they were joined by the principes, who merged into their line to fill the gaps and make up the losses. The triarii moved to the flanks to envelop the enemy. If the hastati were not victorious, they merged backward into the principes. The third line remained in reserve unless the other two failed, in which case the front two merged into the third.

As Roman Legions were composed primarily of heavy infantry, they displayed the advantages and drawbacks of classical heavy infantry. It is notable that three of the biggest defeats (Battle of Carrhae, Battle of Teutoburg Forest, Battle of Ctesiphon) all came at the hands of light infantry or light cavalry forces.

Marian reforms

Problems in the military
By the end of the 2nd century BC, the Republican army was experiencing a severe manpower shortage. Soldiers also were having to serve for longer periods, and fight wars further away from their homes.

Marius takes a hand
The Gracchi had attempted to resolve the former problem by redistributing public land to the lower classes, thereby increasing the number of men eligible for military service. But they were assassinated before they could achieve this social reform. Rome instead followed the opposite but logical path of making any able-bodied citizen eligible to enlist.

The popular Gaius Marius, at the end of the 2nd century, used his popularity to reorganize the Republican army. He took liberties with the letter of the law, to which few objected, and which later were ratified. First, he recruited men from the lower classes who did not meet the official property requirement. Then he reorganized the legions into the cohort system, doing away with the manipular system.

The new legions were made up of 10 cohorts, each with 6 centuries of 80 men. The first cohort carried the aquila, the standard of the legion. This cohort contained only five centuries, but each century had double the number of men in the normal centuries. Altogether, each legion contained approximately 4,800 men.

Professional army
The Marian reforms had great political fallout. Although the officer corps still was composed largely of Roman aristocrats, the rank-and-file troops all were lower-class men; serving in the legions became less every citizen's traditional civic duty to Rome, and more a means of rising in society. This trend was accelerated by Rome's wars of conquest, which resulted in huge influxes of slaves. Freemen with or without land could not compete with free labor. Signing up with a legion allowed the possibility of loot and land enfranchisement.

The reforms also meant that legions were now more-or-less permanent formations, not just temporary armies deployed according to need (the Latin word 'legion' is actually their word for 'levy'). As enduring units, they were able to become more effective fighting forces; more importantly, they could form lasting loyalties to their commanders, rather than keeping loyalties to Rome. The 1-year consular system began to break down, and generals served for longer durations.  This, in turn, meant that troops were more loyal to their commanders, which served as a catalyst for the oppressive and corrupt rule that the Roman military played in the later years under the emperors.

Evaluation
On the one hand, the reforms of Marius created a professional army for extended service abroad. On the other, it increased the stature of the generals and encouraged competition between them, which is what made the civil wars possible, and it is why scholars often cite the Marian reforms as the beginning of the end for the Roman Republic. The subsequent emperors ruthlessly eliminated powerful men and potential successors.

See also
 Political history of the Roman military

External links
The Roman Army After Marius' Reforms - An Introduction